The 2019 Thai League 2 is the 22nd season of the Thai League 2, the second-tier professional league for Thailand's association football clubs, since its establishment in 1997, also known as M-150 Championship due to the sponsorship deal with M-150. A total of 18 teams will compete in the league. The season began on 9 February 2019 and is scheduled to conclude on 27 October 2019.

The 1st transfer window is from 26 November 2018 to 19 February 2019 while the 2nd transfer window is from 24 June 2019 to 19 July 2019.

Changes from last season

Team changes

From Thai League 2
Promoted to 2019 Thai League 1
 PTT Rayong
 Trat
 Chiangmai

Releagated to 2019 Thai League 3
 Krabi
 Angthong

To Thai League 2
Relegated from 2018 Thai League 1
 Bangkok Glass
 Police Tero
 Navy
 Ubon UMT United
 Air Force Central

Promoted from 2018 Thai League 3
 JL Chiangmai United
 Ayutthaya United
 Customs United

Renamed Clubs
 Bangkok Glass was renamed BG Pathum United
 Ubon UMT United was renamed Ubon United
 Air Force Central was renamed Air Force United

Stadium and locations

Foreign Players

League table

Standings

Positions by round

Results by match played

Results

Season statistics

Top scorers
As of 27 October 2019.

Hat-tricks

Attendance

Overall statistics

Attendance by home match played

Source: Thai League 2

See also
 2019 Thai League 1
 2019 Thai League 3
 2019 Thai League 4
 2019 Thailand Amateur League
 2019 Thai FA Cup
 2019 Thai League Cup
 2019 Thailand Champions Cup

References

External links
 Thai League 2 Official Website

Thai League 2 seasons
2019 in Thai football leagues
Thai